The Fresnel integrals  and  are two transcendental functions named after Augustin-Jean Fresnel that are used in optics and are closely related to the error function. They arise in the description of near-field Fresnel diffraction phenomena and are defined through the following integral representations:

Definition 

The Fresnel integrals admit the following power series expansions that converge for all :

These alternative functions are usually known as normalized Fresnel integrals.

Euler spiral 

The Euler spiral, also known as Cornu spiral or clothoid, is the curve generated by a parametric plot of  against . The Cornu spiral was created by Marie Alfred Cornu as a nomogram for diffraction computations in science and engineering.

Thus the length of the spiral measured from the origin can be expressed as

That is, the parameter  is the curve length measured from the origin , and the Euler spiral has infinite length. The vector  also expresses the unit tangent vector along the spiral, giving . Since  is the curve length, the curvature  can be expressed as

Thus the rate of change of curvature with respect to the curve length is

An Euler spiral has the property that its curvature at any point is proportional to the distance along the spiral, measured from the origin.  This property makes it useful as a transition curve in highway and railway engineering: if a vehicle follows the spiral at unit speed, the parameter  in the above derivatives also represents the time. Consequently, a vehicle following the spiral at constant speed will have a constant rate of angular acceleration.

Sections from Euler spirals are commonly incorporated into the shape of rollercoaster loops to make what are known as clothoid loops.

Properties 

Using the power series expansions above, the Fresnel integrals can be extended to the domain of complex numbers, where they become analytic functions of a complex variable.

The Fresnel integrals can be expressed using the error function as follows: 

or

Limits as  approaches infinity
The integrals defining  and  cannot be evaluated in the closed form in terms of elementary functions, except in special cases. The limits of these functions as  goes to infinity are known:

This can be derived with any one of several methods.

As  goes to infinity, the integral along the circular arc  tends to 

where polar coordinates  were used and Jordan's inequality was utilised for the second inequality. The integral along the real axis  tends to the half Gaussian integral

Note too that because the integrand is an entire function on the complex plane, its integral along the whole contour is zero. Overall, we must have

where  denotes the bisector of the first quadrant, as in the diagram. To evaluate the left hand side, parametrize the bisector as

Note that the square of this expression is just . Therefore, substitution gives the left hand side as

Using Euler's formula to take real and imaginary parts of  gives this as

where we have written  to emphasize that the original Gaussian integral's value is completely real with zero imaginary part. Letting

and then equating real and imaginary parts produces the following system of two equations in the two unknowns  and :

Generalization 
The integral

is a confluent hypergeometric function and also an incomplete gamma function

which reduces to Fresnel integrals if real or imaginary parts are taken:

The leading term in the asymptotic expansion is

and therefore

For , the imaginary part of this equation in particular is

The Kummer transformation of the confluent hypergeometric function is

with

Numerical approximation 

For computation to arbitrary precision, the power series is suitable for small argument. For large argument, asymptotic expansions converge faster. Continued fraction methods may also be used.

For computation to particular target precision, other approximations have been developed. A FORTRAN implementation of the Cody approximation that includes the values of the coefficients needed for implementation in other languages was published by van Snyder.

Applications 
The Fresnel integrals were originally used in the calculation of the electromagnetic field intensity in an environment where light bends around opaque objects. More recently, they have been used in the design of highways and railways, specifically their curvature transition zones, see track transition curve. Other applications are rollercoasters or calculating the transitions on a velodrome track to allow rapid entry to the bends and gradual exit.

Gallery

See also 

 Böhmer integral
 Fresnel zone
 Track transition curve
 Euler spiral
 Zone plate
 Dirichlet integral

Notes

References 
 

External links
Cephes, free/open-source C++/C code to compute Fresnel integrals among other special functions. Used in SciPy and ALGLIB.
Faddeeva Package, free/open-source C++/C code to compute complex error functions (from which the Fresnel integrals can be obtained), with wrappers for Matlab, Python, and other languages.
 

Integral calculus
Spirals
Physical optics
Special functions
Special hypergeometric functions
Analytic functions
Diffraction